Culture and Psychology is a quarterly peer-reviewed academic journal that publishes papers in the field of psychology. The journal's editor is Jaan Valsiner. It was established in 1995 and is currently published by SAGE Publications.

Abstracting and indexing 
Culture and Psychology is abstracted and indexed in Scopus and the Social Sciences Citation Index. According to the Journal Citation Reports, its 2009 impact factor is 1.795, ranking it 27th out of 111 journals in the category "Psychology, Multidisciplinary".

References

External links
 
Cultural psychology journals
Publications established in 1995
SAGE Publishing academic journals
Quarterly journals
English-language journals